Xin Yan, now styled as Z Yan, is a Malaysian Chinese-language Bossa Nova singer from Melacca.

Her first album, of Mando pop, under the artist name Xin Yan was called Xinyuan ( wish or desire), a word play on her own name, was released in 2007. Her second album Bossa Princess was released in 2010. The album is also listed in English as "Brasiliero" by "Z Yan" in Chinese Malaysian music magazines.

References

21st-century Malaysian women singers
Living people
Year of birth missing (living people)
People from Malacca
Malaysian people of Chinese descent